The South Africa women's cricket team toured Ireland in 1997, South Africa's first international cricket series post-exclusion.  The tour consisted of a three-match women's One Day International series, which South Africa won 3–0.

One Day International series

1st ODI

2nd ODI

3rd ODI

References

South African cricket tours of Ireland
South Africa 1997
Ireland
1997 in South African women's sport
1997 in Irish women's sport
1997 in women's cricket
August 1997 sports events in Europe